The Catholic Church in Solomon Islands is part of the worldwide Catholic Church, under the spiritual leadership of the Pope in Rome.

Catholic evangelisation of the Solomon Islands archipelago in the nineteenth century was mostly in the hands of the Marist Fathers. 

There are just over 90,000 Catholics in the nation of Solomon Islands; just under a quarter of the total population.  The country is divided into three dioceses: the Archdiocese of Honiara, the Diocese of Gizo and the Diocese of Auki.

In 1957 the current cathedral, Holy Cross Cathedral in Honiara, was blessed and opened to the public. Solomon Islands sent a delegation of young people for the first time to World Youth Day 2008 when it was held in Sydney, Australia. Peter Houhou became the first locally-born bishop when the was consecrated as Bishop of Auki in 2018.  

Holy Name of Mary Seminary at Tenaru in Guadalcanal was founded in 1995 and serves the three dioceses. It is under the care of the Congregation of the Mission (Vincentian Fathers and Brothers).

External links
 Catholic Church in Papua New Guinea and the Solomon Islands

References

Solomon
 
Solomon